Carlos David Lizarazo Landazury (born 26 April 1991) is a Colombian football player who plays as a forward and midfielder for Categoría Primera A side Deportivo Cali.

In 2016, he went out on loan to FC Dallas of Major League Soccer.

References

External links
 

1991 births
Living people
Footballers from Cali
Colombian footballers
Colombian expatriate footballers
Deportivo Cali footballers
Cruz Azul footballers
FC Dallas players
América de Cali footballers
Once Caldas footballers
Categoría Primera A players
Major League Soccer players
Association football midfielders
Colombian expatriate sportspeople in the United States
Colombian expatriate sportspeople in Mexico
Expatriate footballers in Mexico
Expatriate soccer players in the United States